Participatory culture, an opposing concept to consumer culture, is a culture in which private individuals (the public) do not act as consumers only, but also as contributors or producers (prosumers). The term is most often applied to the production or creation of some type of published media.

Overview 
Recent advances in technologies (mostly personal computers and the Internet) have enabled private persons to create and publish such media, usually through the Internet. Since the technology now enables new forms of expression and engagement in public discourse, participatory culture not only supports individual creation but also informal relationships that pair novices with experts. This new culture, as it relates to the Internet, has been described as Web 2.0. In participatory culture, "young people creatively respond to a plethora of electronic signals and cultural commodities in ways that surprise their makers, finding meanings and identities never meant to be there and defying simple nostrums that bewail the manipulation or passivity of "consumers."

The increasing access to the Internet has come to play an integral part in the expansion of participatory culture because it increasingly enables people to work collaboratively, generate and disseminate news, ideas, and creative works, and connect with people who share similar goals and interests (see affinity groups). The potential of participatory culture for civic engagement and creative expression has been investigated by media scholar Henry Jenkins. In 2009, Jenkins and co-authors Ravi Purushotma, Katie Clinton, Margaret Weigel and Alice Robison authored a white paper entitled Confronting the Challenges of Participatory Culture: Media Education for the 21st Century. This paper describes a participatory culture as one:

 With relatively low barriers to artistic expression and civic engagement
 With strong support for creating and sharing one's creations with others
 With some type of informal mentorship whereby what is known by the most experienced is passed along to novices
 Where members believe that their contributions matter
 Where members feel some degree of social connection with one another (at the least they care what other people think about what they have created).

History 
Participatory culture has been around longer than the Internet. The emergence of the Amateur Press Association in the middle of the 19th century is an example of historical participatory culture; at that time, young people were hand typing and printing their own publications. These publications were mailed throughout a network of people and resemble what are now called social networks. The evolution from zines, radio shows, group projects, and gossips to blogs, podcasts, wikis, and social networks has impacted society greatly. With web services such as eBay, Blogger, Wikipedia, Photobucket, Facebook, and YouTube, it is no wonder that culture has become more participatory. The implications of the gradual shift from production to produsage are profound, and will affect the very core of culture, economy, society, and democracy.

Forms 

Forms of participatory culture can be manifested in affiliations, expressions, collaborative problem solving, and circulations. Affiliations include both formal and informal memberships in online communities such as discussion boards or social media. Expression refers to the types of media that could be created. This may manifest as memes, fanfiction, or other forms of mash-ups. When individuals and groups work together on a particular form of media or media product, like a wiki, then they engage in collaborative problem solving. Finally, circulation refers to the means through which the communication may be spread. This could include blogs, vlogs, podcasts, and even some forms of social media. Some of the most popular apps that involve participation include: Facebook, Snapchat, Instagram, Tinder, LinkedIn, Twitter, and TikTok.

Fanfiction creators were one of the first communities to showcase the public could participate in pop culture, by changing, growing, and altering TV show storylines during their run times, as well as strengthen the series’ popularity after the last episode aired. Some fanfiction creators develop theories and speculation, while others create ‘new’ material outside of the confines of the original content. Fans expand on the original story, putting the characters falling in love within the series through different adventures and sexualities. These communities are composed of audiences and readers from around the world, at different ages, with different backgrounds, coming together to develop theories and possibilities about current TV shows, books and films, or expand and continue the stories of TV shows, books, and movies that have come to a close.

Technology 
As technology continues to enable new avenues for communication, collaboration, and circulation of ideas, it has also given rise to new opportunities for consumers to create their own content. Barriers like time and money are beginning to become less significant to large groups of consumers. For example, the creation of movies once required large amounts of expensive equipment, but now movie clips can be made with equipment that is affordable to a growing number of people. The ease with which consumers create new material has also grown. Extensive knowledge of computer programming is no longer necessary to create content on the internet. Media sharing over the Internet acts as a platform to invite users to participate and create communities that share similar interests through duplicated sources, original content, and re-purposed material.

Social media 
People no longer blindly absorb and consume what large media corporations distribute. Today there are a great deal of people who are consumers who also produce their own content (referring to "prosumers"). The reason participatory culture is a high interest topic is due to the fact that there are just so many different social media platforms to participate and contribute to. These happen to be some of the leaders in the social media industry, and are the reason people are able to have such an advantage to participate in media creation. Today, millions of people across the world have the ability to post, quote, film, or create whatever they want. With the aid of these platforms, the ability to reach a global audience has never been easier.

Social media and politics 
Social media have become a huge factor in politics and civics in not just elections, but gaining funds, spreading information, getting legislation and petition support, and other political activities. Social media make it easier for the public to make an impact and participate in politics. A study that showed the connection between Facebook messages among friends and how these messages have influenced political expression, voting, and information seeking in the 2012 United States presidential election. Social media mobilizes people easily and effectively, and does the same for the circulation of information. These can accomplish political goals such as gaining support for legislation, but social media can also greatly influence elections. The impact social media can have on elections was shown in the 2016 United States presidential election, hundreds of fake news stories about candidates were shared on Facebook tens of millions of times. Some people do not recognize fake news and vote based on false information.

Web 2.0 
Not only has hardware increased the individual's ability to submit content to the internet so that it may be reached by a wide audience, but in addition numerous internet sites have increased access. Websites like Flickr, Wikipedia, and Facebook encourage the submission of content to the Internet. They increase the ease with which a user may post content by allowing them to submit information even if they only have an Internet browser. The need for additional software is eliminated. These websites also serve to create online communities for the production of content. These communities and their web services have been labelled as part of Web 2.0.

The relationship between Web 2.0 tools and participatory culture is more than just material, however. As the mindsets and skillsets of participatory practices have been increasingly taken up, people are increasingly likely to exploit new tools and technology in 2.0 ways. One example is the use of cellphone technology to engage "smart mobs" for political change worldwide. In countries where cellphone usage exceeds use of any other form of digital technology, passing information via mobile phone has helped bring about significant political and social change. Notable examples include the so-called "Orange Revolution" in Ukraine, the overthrow of Philippine President Joseph Estrada, and regular political protests worldwide

Participatory media 
There have been several ways that participatory media allows people to create, connect, and share their content or build friendships throughout the media. YouTube encourages people to create and upload their content to share it around the world, creating an environment for content creators new or old. Discord allows people, primarily gamers, to connect with each other around the world and acts as a live chatroom. Twitch is a streaming media website where content creators can "go live" for viewers all around the world. A lot of times, these participatory sites have community events such as charity events or memorial streams for someone important to the people in the Twitch community.

Relationship to the smartphone 
The smartphone is one example that combines the elements of interactivity, identity, and mobility. The mobility of the smartphone demonstrates that media is no longer bound by time and space and can be used in any context. Technology continues to progress in this direction as it becomes more user driven and less restricted to schedules and locations: for example, the progression of movies from theaters to private home viewing, to now the smartphone that can be watched anytime and anywhere. The smartphone also enhances the participatory culture by increased levels of interactivity. Instead of merely watching, users are actively involved in making decisions, navigating pages, contributing their own content and choosing what links to follow. This goes beyond the "keyboard" level of interactivity, where a person presses a key and the expected letter appears, and becomes rather a dynamic activity with continually new options and changing setting, without a set formula to follow. The consumer role shifts from a passive receiver to an active contributor. The smartphone epitomizes this by the endless choices and ways to get personally involved with multiple media at the same time, in a nonlinear way.

The smartphone also contributes to participatory culture because of how it changes the perception of identity. A user can hide behind an avatar, false profile, or simply an idealized self when interacting with others online. There is no accountability to be who one says one is. The ability to slide in and out of roles changes the effect of media on culture, and also the user himself. Now not only are people active participants in media and culture, but also their imagined selves.

Producers, consumers, and "produsage" 
In Vincent Miller's Understanding Digital Culture, he makes the argument that the lines between producer and consumers have become blurry. Producers are those that create content and cultural objects, and consumers are the audience or purchasers of those objects. By referring to Axel Bruns' idea of "prosumer," Miller argues "With the advent of convergent new media and the plethora of choice in sources for information, as well as the increased capacity for individuals to produce content themselves, this shift away from producer hegemony to audience or consumer power would seem to have accelerated, thus eroding the producer-consumer distinction" (p. 87). "Prosumer" is the ending result of a strategy that has been increasingly used which encourages feedback between producers and consumers (prosumers), "which allows for more consumer influence over the production of goods."

Bruns (2008) refers to produsage, therefore, as a community collaboration that participants can access in order to share "content, contributions, and tasks throughout the networked community" (p. 14). This is similar to how Wikipedia allows users to write, edit, and ultimately use content. Producers are active participants who are empowered by their participation as network builders. Bruns (2008) describes the empowerment for users as different from the typical "top-down mediated spaces of the traditional mediaspheres" (p. 14). Produsage occurs when the users are the producers and vice versa, essentially eliminating the need for these "top-down" interventions. The collaboration of each participant is based on a principle of inclusivity; each member contributes valuable information for another user to use, add to, or change. In a community of learners, collaboration through produsage can provide access to content for every participant, not just those with some kind of authority. Every participant has authority.

This leads to Bruns' (2008) idea of "equipotentiality: the assumption that while the skills and abilities of all the participants in the produsage project are not equal, they have an equal ability to make a worthy contribution to the project" (p. 25). Because there are no more distinctions between producers and consumers, every participant has an equal chance to participate meaningfully in produsage.

In July 2020, an academic description reported on the nature and rise of the "robot prosumer", derived from modern-day technology and related participatory culture, that, in turn, was substantially predicted earlier by Frederik Pohl and other science fiction writers.

Explicit and implicit participation 
An important contribution has been made by media theorist Mirko Tobias Schäfer who distinguishes explicit and implicit participation (2011). Explicit participation describes the conscious and active engagement of users in fan communities or of developers in creative processes. Implicit participation is more subtle and unfolds often without the user's knowledge. In her book, The Culture of Connectivity, Jose Van Dijck emphasizes the importance of recognizing this distinction in order to thoroughly analyze user agency as a techno-cultural construct (2013).

Dijck (2013) outlines the various ways in which explicit participation can be conceptualized. The first is the statistical conception of user demographics. Websites may “publish facts and figures about their user intensity (e.g., unique monthly users), their national and global user diversity, and relevant demographic facts” (p. 33). For instance, Facebook publishes user demographic data such as gender, age, income, education level and more. Explicit participation can also take place on the research end, where an experimental subject interacts with a platform for research purposes. Dijck (2013) references Leon et al. (2011), giving an example of an experimental study where “a number of users may be selected to perform tasks so researchers can observe their ability to control privacy settings “(p. 33). Lastly, explicit participation may inform ethnographic data through observational studies, or qualitative interview-based research concerning user habits.

Implicit participation is achieved by implementing user activities into user interfaces and back-end design. Schäfer argues that the success of popular Web 2.0 and social media applications thrives on implicit participation. The notion of implicit participation expands theories of participatory culture as formulated by Henry Jenkins and Axel Bruns who both focus most prominently on explicit participation (p. 44). Considering implicit participation allows therefore for a more accurate analysis of the role technology in co-shaping user interactions and user generated content (pp. 51–52).

Textual Poachers 
The term "textual poachers" was originated by de Certeau and has been popularized by Jenkins. Jenkins uses this term to describe how some fans go through content like their favourite movie and engage with the parts that they are interested in, unlike audiences who watch the show more passively and move on to the next thing. Jenkins takes a stand against the stereotypical portrayal of fans as obsessive nerds who are out of touch with reality. He demonstrates that fans are pro-active constructors of an alternative culture using elements "poached" and reworked from the mass media. Specifically, fans use what they have poached to become producers themselves, creating new cultural materials in a variety of analytical and creative formats from "meta" essays to fanfiction, comics, music, and more. In this way, fans become active participants in the construction and circulation of textual meanings. Fans usually interact with each other through fan groups, fanzines, social events, and even in the case of Trekkers (fans of Star Trek) interact with each other through annual conferences.

In a participatory culture, fans are actively involved in the production, which may also influence producer decisions within the medium. Fans do not only interact with each other but also try to interact with media producers to express their opinions. For example, what would be the ending between two characters in a TV show? Therefore, fans are readers and producers of culture. Participatory culture transforms the media consumption experience into the production of new texts, in fact, the production of new cultures and new communities. The result is an autonomous, self-sufficient fan culture.

Gendered experiences 

Participatory culture lacks representation of the female, which has created a misrepresentation of women online. This in turn, makes it difficult for women to represent themselves with authenticity, and deters participation of females in participatory culture. The content that is viewed on the internet in participatory situations is biased because of the overrepresentation of male generated information, and the ideologies created by the male presence in media, thus creates a submissive role for the female user, as they unconsciously accept patriarchal ideologies as reality. With males in the dominant positions "media industries [engage]… existing technologies to break up and reformulate media texts for reasons of their own".

Design intent from the male perspective is a main issue deterring accurate female representation. Females active in participatory culture are at a disadvantage because the content they are viewing is not designed with their participation in mind. Instead of producing male biased content, "feminist interaction design should seek to bring about political emancipation… it should also force designers to question their own position to assert what an "improved society" is and how to achieve it". The current interactions and interfaces of participatory culture fails to "challenge the hegemonic dominance, legitimacy and appropriateness of positivist epistemologies; theorize from the margins; and problematize gender". Men typically are more involved in the technology industry as "relatively fewer women work in the industry that designs technology now... only in the areas of HCI/usability is the gender balance of workforce anything like equal". Since technology and design is at the crux of the creation of participatory culture "much can – and should – be said about who does what, and it is fair to raise the question of whether an industry of men can design for women". "Although the members of the group are not directly teaching or perhaps even indicating the object of… representation, their activities inevitably lead to the exposure of the other individual to that object and this leads to that individual acquiring the same narrow… representations as the other group members have. Social learning of this type (another, similar process is known as local enhancement) has been shown to lead to relatively stable social transmission of behavior over time". Local enhancement is the driving mechanism that influences the audience to embody and recreate the messages produced in media. Statistically, men are actively engaging in the production of these problematic representations, whereas, women are not contributing to the portrayal of women experiences because of local enhancement that takes place on the web. There is no exact number to determine the precise percentage for female users; in 2011 there were numerous surveys that slightly fluctuate in numbers, but none seem to surpass 15 percent. This shows a large disparity of online users in regards to gender when looking at Wikipedia content. Bias arises as the content presented in Wikipedia seems to be more male oriented.

Promise and potential

In mass media and civic engagement 
Participatory culture has been hailed by some as a way to reform communication and enhance the quality of media. According to media scholar Henry Jenkins, one result of the emergence of participatory cultures is an increase in the number of media resources available, giving rise to increased competition between media outlets. Producers of media are forced to pay more attention to the needs of consumers who can turn to other sources for information.

Howard Rheingold and others have argued that the emergence of participatory cultures will enable deep social change. Until as recently as the end of the 20th century, Rheingold argues, a handful of generally privileged, generally wealthy people controlled nearly all forms of mass communication—newspapers, television, magazines, books and encyclopedias. Today, however, tools for media production and dissemination are readily available and allow for what Rheingold labels "participatory media."

As participation becomes easier, the diversity of voices that can be heard also increases. At one time only a few mass media giants controlled most of the information that flowed into the homes of the public, but with the advance of technology even a single person has the ability to spread information around the world. The diversification of media has benefits because in cases where the control of media becomes concentrated it gives those who have control the ability to influence the opinions and information that flows to the public domain. Media concentration provides opportunity for corruption, but as information continues to become accessed from more and more places it becomes increasingly difficult to control the flow of information to the will of an agenda. Participatory Culture is also seen as a more democratic form of communication as it stimulates the audience to take an active part because they can help shape the flow of ideas across media formats. The democratic tendency lent to communication by participatory culture allows new models of production that are not based on a hierarchical standard. In the face of increased participation, the traditional hierarchies will not disappear, but "Community, collaboration, and self-organization" can become the foundation of corporations as powerful alternatives. Although there may be no real hierarchy evident in many collaborative websites, their ability to form large pools of collective intelligence is not compromised.

In civics 
Participatory culture civics organizations mobilize participatory cultures towards political action. They build on participatory cultures and organize such communities toward civic and political goals. Examples include Harry Potter Alliance, Invisible Children, Inc., and Nerdfighters, which each leverage shared cultural interests to connect and organize members towards explicit political goals. These groups run campaigns by informing, connecting, and eventually organizing their members through new media platforms. Neta Kligler-Vilenchik identified three mechanisms used to translate cultural interests into political outcomes:
 Tapping shared passion around content worlds and their communities
 Creative production of content
 Informal discussion spaces for conversations about salient issues

In education 
Social and participatory media allow for—and, indeed, call for—a shift in how we approach teaching and learning in the classroom. The increased availability of the Internet in classrooms allows for greater access to information. For example, it is no longer necessary for relevant knowledge to be contained in some combination of the teacher and textbooks; today, knowledge can be more de-centralized and made available for all learners to access. The teacher, then, can help facilitate efficient and effective means of accessing, interpreting, and making use of that knowledge.

Jenkins believes that participatory culture can play a role in the education of young people as a new form of implicit curriculum. He finds a growing body of academic research showing the potential benefits of participatory cultures, both formal and informal, for the education of young people. Including Peer-to-peer learning opportunities, the awareness of intellectual property and multiculturalism, cultural expression and the development of skills valued in the modern workplace, and a more empowered conception of citizenship.

Challenges

In online platforms 
Rachael Sullivan discusses how some online platforms can be a challenge. According to Rachael Sullivan's book review, she emphasizes on Reddit, and the content used that can be offensive and inappropriate. Memes, GIFs, and other content that users create are negative, and are used primarily for trolling. Reddit has a platform where any users in the community can post without restrictions or barriers, regardless of whether it's positive or negative. This has the potential for backlash against Reddit, as it doesn't restrict content that could be considered offensive or pejorative, and can reflect negatively on the community as a whole. On the other hand, Reddit would likely face similar backlash for restricting what others would consider their right to free speech, although free speech only pertains to government backlash and not private companies.

YouTube and participatory culture
YouTube has been the start-up for many up and coming pop stars; Both Justin Bieber and One Direction can credit their presence on YouTube as the catalyst for their respective careers. Other users have gained fame or notoriety by expounding on how simple it can be to become a popular YouTuber. Charlie “How to Get Featured on YouTube,” is one such example, in that his library consists solely of videos on how to get featured, and nothing else. YouTube offers the younger generation the opportunity to test out their content, while gaining feedback via likes, dislikes, and comments to find out where they need to improve.

For consumers 
All people want to be a consumer in some and an active contributor in other situations. Being a consumer or active contributor is not an attribute of a person, but of a context. The important criteria that needs to be taken into account is personally meaningful activities. Participatory cultures empower humans to be active contributors in personally meaningful activities. The drawback of such cultures is that they may force humans to cope with the burden of being an active contributor in personally irrelevant activities.
This trade-off can be illustrated with the potential and drawbacks of "Do-It-Yourself Societies": starting with self-service restaurants and self-service gas stations a few decades ago, and this trend has been greatly accelerated over the last 10 years. Through modern tools (including electronic commerce supported by the Web), humans are empowered to do many tasks themselves that were done previously by skilled domain workers serving as agents and intermediaries. While this shift provides power, freedom, and control to customers (e.g., banking can be done at any time of the day with ATMs, and from any location with the Web), it has led also to some less desirable consequences. People may consider some of these tasks not very meaningful personally and therefore would be more than content with a consumer role. Aside from simple tasks that require a small or no learning effort, customers lack the experience the professionals have acquired and maintained through daily use of systems, and the broad background knowledge to do these tasks efficiently and effectively. The tools used to do these tasks — banking, travel reservations, buying airline tickets, checking out groceries at the supermarket — are core technologies for the professionals, but occasional technologies for the customers. This will put a new, substantial burden on customers rather than having skilled domain workers doing these tasks.

Significantly, too, as businesses increasingly recruit participatory practices and resources to market goods and services, consumers who are comfortable working within participatory media are at a distinct advantage over those who are less comfortable. Not only do consumers who are resistant to making use of the affordances of participatory culture have decreased access to knowledge, goods, and services, but they are less likely to take advantage of the increased leverage inherent in engaging with businesses as a prosumer.

In education

Participation gap 
This category is linked to the issue of the digital divide, the concern with providing access to technology for all learners. The movement to break down the digital divide has included efforts to bring computers into classrooms, libraries, and other public places. These efforts have been largely successful, but as Jenkins et al. argue, the concern is now with the quality access to available technologies. They explain:

What a person can accomplish with an outdated machine in a public library with mandatory filtering software and no opportunity for storage or transmission pales in comparison to what [a] person can accomplish with a home computer with unfettered Internet access, high band-width, and continuous connectivity.(Current legislation to block access to social networking software in schools and public libraries will further widen the participation gap.) The school system's inability to close this participation gap has negative consequences for everyone involved. On the one hand,those youth who are most advanced in media literacies are often stripped of their technologies and robbed of their best techniques for learning in an effort to ensure a uniform experience for all in the classroom. On the other hand, many youth who have had no exposure to these new kinds of participatory cultures outside school find themselves struggling to keep up with their peers. (Jenkins et al. pg. 15)

Passing out the technology free of charge is not enough to ensure youth and adults learn how to use the tools effectively. Most American youths now have at least minimal access to networked computers, be it at school or in public libraries, but "children who have access to home computers demonstrate more positive attitudes towards computers, show more enthusiasm, and report more enthusiast and ease when using computer than those who do not (Page 8 Wartella, O'Keefe, and Scantlin (2000)). As the children with more access to computers gain more comfort in using them, the less tech-savvy students get pushed aside. It is important to note that it is more than a simple binary at work here, as working-class youths may still have access so some technologies (e.g. gaming consoles) while other forms remain unattainable. This inequality would allow certain skills to develop in some children, such as play, while others remain unavailable, such as the ability to produce and distribute self-created media.

In a participatory culture, one of the key challenges that is encountered is participatory gap. This comes into play with the integration of media and society. Some of the largest challenges we face in regards to the participation gap is in education, learning, accessibility, and privacy. All of these factors are huge setbacks when it comes to the relatively new integration of youth participating in today's popular forms of media.	

Education is one realm where the participatory gap is very prominent. In today's society, our education system heavily focuses on integrating media into its curriculum. More and more our classrooms are utilizing computers and technology as learning aides. While this is beneficial for students and teachers to enhance learning environments and allow them to access a plethora of information, it also presents many problems. The participation gap leaves many schools as well as its teachers and students at a disadvantage as they struggle to utilize current technology in their curriculum. Many schools do not have to funding to invest in computers or new technologies for their academic programs. They are unable to afford computers, cameras, and interactive learning tools, which prevents students from accessing the tools that other, wealthier schools have.	

Another challenge is that as we integrate new technology into schools and academics, we need to be able to teach people how to use these instruments. Teaching both student and adults how to use new media technologies is essential so that they can actively participate as their peers do. Additionally, teaching children how to navigate the information available on new media technologies is very important as there is so much content available on the internet these days. For beginners this can be overwhelming and teaching kids as well as adults how to access what is pertinent, reliable and viable information will help them improve how they utilize media technologies.

One huge aspect of the participation gap is access. Access to the Internet and computers is a luxury in some households, and in the today's society, access to a computer and the Internet is often overlooked by both the education system and many other entities. In today's society, almost everything we do is based online, from banking to shopping to homework and ordering food, we spend all of our time doing everyday tasks online. For those who are unable to access these things, they are automatically put at a severe disadvantage. They cannot participate in activities that their peers do and may suffer both academically and socially.	

The last feature of the participation gap is privacy concerns. We put everything on the Internet these days, from pictures to personal information. It is important to question how this content will be used. Who owns this content? Where does it go or where is it stored? For example, the controversy of Facebook and its ownership and rights of user's content has been a hot button issue over the past few years. It is disconcerting to a lot of people to find out that their content they have posted to a particular website is no longer under their control, but may be retained and used by the website in the future.	

All of the above-mentioned issued are key factors in the participation gap. They play a large role is the challenges we face as we incorporate new media technology into everyday life. These challenges affect how many populations interact with the changing media in society and unfortunately leave many at a disadvantage. This divide between users of new media and those who are unable to access these technologies is also referred to as the digital divide. It leaves low-income families and children at a severe disadvantage that affects them in the present as well as the future. Students for example are largely affected because without access to the Internet or a computer they are unable to do homework and projects and will moreover be unsuccessful in school. These poor grades can lead to frustration with academia and furthermore may lead to delinquent behavior, low income jobs, decreased chanced of pursuing higher educations, and poor job skills.

Transparency problem 
Increased facility with technology does not necessarily lead to increased ability to interpret how technology exerts its own pressure on us. Indeed, with increased access to information, the ability to interpret the viability of that information becomes increasingly difficult. It is crucial, then, to find ways to help young learners develop tactics for engaging critically with the tools and resources they use.

Ethics challenge 
This is identified as a "breakdown of traditional forms of professional training and socialization that might prepare young people for their increasingly public roles as media makers and community participants" (Jenkins et al. pg. 5). For example, throughout most of the last half of the 20th century learners who wanted to become journalists would generally engage in a formal apprenticeship through journalism classes and work on a high school newspaper. This work would be guided by a teacher who was an expert in the rules and norms of journalism and who would confer that knowledge to student-apprentices. With increasing access to Web 2.0 tools, however, anybody can be a journalist of sorts, with or without an apprenticeship to the discipline. A key goal in media education, then, must be to find ways to help learners develop techniques for active reflection on the choices they make—and contributions they offer—as members of a participatory culture.

Issues for educators and educational policy-makers 
As teachers, administrators, and policymakers consider the role of new media and participatory practices in the school environment, they will need to find ways to address the multiple challenges. Challenges include finding ways to work with the decentralization of knowledge inherent in online spaces; developing policies with respect to filtering software that protects learners and schools without limiting students' access to sites that enable participation; and considering the role of assessment in classrooms that embrace participatory practices.

Cultures are substantially defined by their media and their tools for thinking, working, learning, and collaborating. Unfortunately a large number of new media are designed to see humans only as consumers; and people, particularly young people in educational institutions, form mindsets based on their exposure to specific media.
The current mindset about learning, teaching, and education is dominated by a view in which teaching is often fitted "into a mold in which a single, presumably omniscient teacher explicitly tells or shows presumably unknowing learners something they presumably know nothing about". A critical challenge is a reformulation and reconceptualization of this impoverished and misleading conception. Learning should not take place in a separate phase and in a separate place, but should be integrated into people's lives allowing them to construct solutions to their own problems. As they experience breakdowns in doing so, they should be able to learn on demand by gaining access to directly relevant information. The direct usefulness of new knowledge for actual problem situations greatly improves the motivation to learn the new material because the time and effort invested in learning are immediately worthwhile for the task at hand — not merely for some putative long-term gain.
In order to create active contributor mindsets serving as the foundation of participatory cultures, learning cannot be restricted to finding knowledge that is "out there". Rather than serving as the "reproductive organ of a consumer society" educational institutions must cultivate the development of an active contributor mindset by creating habits, tools and skills that help people become empowered and willing to actively contribute to the design of their lives and communities.
Beyond supporting contributions from individual designers, educational institutions need to build a culture and mindset of sharing, supported by effective technologies and sustained by personal motivation to occasionally work for the benefit of groups and communities. This includes finding ways for people to see work done for the benefits of others being "on-task", rather than as extra work for which there is no recognition and no reward.

A new form of literacy 

Jenkins et al. believes that conversation surrounding the digital divide should focus on opportunities to participate and to develop the cultural competencies and social skills required to take part rather than get stuck on the question of technological access. As institutions, schools have been slow on the uptake of participatory culture. Instead, afterschool programs currently devote more attention to the development of new media literacies, or, a set of cultural competencies and social skills that young people need in the new media landscape. Participatory culture shifts this literacy from the individual level to community involvement. Networking and collaboration develop social skills that are vital to the new literacies. Although new, these skills build on an existing foundation of traditional literacy, research skills, technical skills, and critical analysis skills taught in the classroom.

Meta-design: a design methodology supporting participatory cultures 

Metadesign is "design for designers"  It represents an emerging conceptual framework aimed at defining and creating social and technical infrastructures in which participatory cultures can come alive and new forms of collaborative design can take place. It extends the traditional notion of system design beyond the original development of a system to allow users become co-designers and co-developers. It is grounded in the basic assumption that future uses and problems cannot be completely anticipated at design time, when a system is developed. Users, at use time, will discover mismatches between their needs and the support that an existing system can provide for them. These mismatches will lead to breakdowns that serve as potential sources of new insights, new knowledge, and new understanding.
Meta-design supports participatory cultures as follows:
 Making changes must seem possible: Contributors should not be intimidated and should not have the impression that they are incapable of making changes; the more users become convinced that changes are not as difficult as they think they are, the more they may be willing to participate.
 Changes must be technically feasible: If a system is closed, then contributors cannot make any changes; as a necessary prerequisite, there needs to be possibilities and mechanisms for extension.
 Benefits must be perceived: Contributors have to believe that what they get in return justifies the investment they make. The benefits perceived may vary and can include professional benefits (helping for one's own work), social benefits (increased status in a community, possibilities for jobs), and personal benefits (engaging in fun activities).
 The environments must support tasks that people engage in: The best environments will not succeed if they are focused on activities that people do rarely or consider of marginal value.
 Low barriers must exist to sharing changes: Evolutionary growth is greatly accelerated in systems in which participants can share changes and keep track of multiple versions easily. If sharing is difficult, it creates an unnecessary burden that participants are unwilling to overcome.

See also 
 Affinity space
 Constructed world
 Consumtariat
 Hypersociability
 Prosumer
 Public participation
 Remix culture
 The Long Tail
 Transmedia storytelling

References

External links -
 : Henry Jenkins describes "Participatory culture" (May 7, 2013)

Collaboration
Internet culture
Digital divide
Culture